Prunus salicina (syn. Prunus triflora or Prunus thibetica), commonly called the Japanese plum or Chinese plum, is a small deciduous tree native to China. It is now also grown in fruit orchards in Vietnam, Korea, Japan, Israel, the United States, and Australia.

Prunus salicina should not be confused with Prunus mume, a related species also grown in China, Japan, Korea and Vietnam. Another tree, Prunus japonica, is also a separate species despite having a Latin name similar to Prunus salicina'''s common name. 

 Names 
Some names for this plant, in addition to Japanese or Chinese plum, are Willow-leaf cherry, Asian Plum, in English, Ameixa or Ameixa-japonesa in Portuguese, 李 li in Mandarin and Japanskt plommon in Swedish. 

The genus, Prunus, comes from the Greek Prunum, meaning plum. The specific epithet, salicina, is derived from the Latin word for willow.

The leaves are 6–12 cm long and 2.5–5 cm broad, with scalloped margins, which when young is often mixed with simple gland-tipped teeth. The leaves' shape tend to be oblong, though it sometimes varies slightly more obovate (broader above the middle), narrowly elliptic, or in rare cases being slightly ovate (broader half below the middle). The base of the leaf is wedge-shaped, and its apex ranges from acute (pointed) to caudate (having a slender short tail). The upper side of the leaf is dark green and lustrous, and have 6 or 7 secondary veins on either side of midvein, not extending to leaf margin.

The winter buds of the Prunus salicina are purplish red, and are occasionally hairy at scale margins, though this is rare. The flowers are produced in early spring, around April, each about 2 cm in diameter with five white petals, and come in groups of 3. The pedicel is 1–1.5 cm, and its sepals are oblong-ovate and about 5mm, hairless on the outside, with loosely serrated margins. The sepal's apex is acute to obtuse. The petals of the flower are white, oblong-obovate, with a wedge-shaped base and a jagged margin near the apex. The ovary is hairless and the stigma disc-shaped. 

The fruit is a drupe, 4–7 cm in diameter with yellow-pink flesh. The skin can be yellow, red, or sometimes green or purple, and has a powdery coating. The shape of the drupe is spherical, egg-shaped, or conical, and it is 3.5–5 cm in diameter, though it can reach 7 cm in diameter in horticultural forms. They fruit from July to August. When fully ripe it can be eaten raw. In comparison to  the Prunus domestica, the Prunus salicina, fruit has a higher flavor and aroma, better texture, more color, bigger size, and good nutritional values. 

The pit of the Prunus salicina is ovoid (egg-shaped) to oblong, and wrinkled. 

 Growth Pattern 
The Japanese plum, like other Prunus fruit tree species, is self-incompatible and requires cross pollination to ensure fruit set because this genus is unable to bear fruit parthenocarpically..

 Habitat and distribution 
The Prunus salicina grows in sparse forests, forest margins, thickets, along trails in mountains and stream sides in valleys, at elevations of 200--2600 meters, in China.

The domestication center of origin of the Prunus salicina is southwestern China, from the Yangtze River Basin. Wild populations of this species are reported as thriving in the provinces of Shaanxi and Gansu. It is recorded as an introduced species in both Australia and Japan. 

 Ecology Prunus salicina is strongly dependent on endomycorrhizal relationships, similar to other species of plum.  Ectomycorrhizal relationships with the fungus Hebeloma hiemale was shown to increase net growth in Prunus cerasifera  x salicina, compared to chemical fertilizer, compost and a control.

The effects of the Prunus salicina in improving soil in karst areas in China, have been mixed. A study conducted in Guiyang Karst Park, Guizhou, China, concluded that Prunus salicina, in combination with the moss species, Homomallium plagiangium, Cyrto-hypnum pygmaeuman and Brachythecium perminusculum,  and the herbs Veronica arvensis and Youngia japonica, were suitable pioneer plant species to cultivate for use in restoration of regions of karstic soil erosion. Planted on cropland suffering from rocky desertification, in the city of Hechi, Prunus salicina increased the carbon-to-nitrogen ratio, and the soil quality at the 10–20 cm soil layer, though in general, it had limited influence on soil improvement because of its fast growing and high output, increasing the absorption of nutrients from the soil.

Cultivation
The main producing country of Japanese plums is China, followed by the United States of America, Mexico, Italy, Spain, Pakistan, Korea, Australia, Chile, France, South Africa and Argentina. The most famous variety of this fruit in Vietnam is the Tam Hoa plum grown in Bắc Hà town, in Lào Cai Province.

Japanese cultivars were introduced into the United States in the latter half of the 19th century, where subsequent breeding produced many more cultivars, generally with larger fruit. Plant breeder Luther Burbank developed a number of cultivars by hybridizing Prunus salicina with Prunus simonii and other native North American diploid plums such as Prunus americana, Prunus hortulana or Prunus munsoniana. In the late 19th and early 20th centuries, from these hybridizations Burbank selected cultivars such as ‘Beauty’, ‘Eldorado’, ‘Formosa’, ‘Gaviota’, ‘Santa Rosa’, ‘Shiro’, and ‘Wickson’, some of which are still widely grown .One of the famous cultivars, “Santa Rosa”, named after the city in California. 

Most of the fresh plums sold in North American supermarkets are Prunus salicina cultivars or hybrids. They are grown on a large scale in a number of other countries, for example, they dominate the stone fruit industry in Western Australia. 

 Threats 
In open field cultivation this species is vulnerable to several viruses including plum pox virus and plum necrotic ringspot virus. Additional threats to this species remain unknown, and while there are several known threats to the forests of China, including logging, deforestation and air and water pollution it is unknown whether these have a direct effect on Prunus salicina. As of 2023, its threat status on the IUCN Red List is Least Concern, and this species' population is stable.  The IUCN Red List recommends "the incorporation of population management and monitoring in protected areas where this species is known to occur" and  "additional ex situ collection, ensuring the full range of genetic diversity found in the wild is represented in genebanks."

Uses

 Culinary 
Since Prunus salicina Linn. fruit has a short-shelf life (3–4 days) under room temperature as well as cold storage (1–2 weeks), it is often prepared into jams, jellies, wine, and other beverages. Black pepper, coriander, cumin, clove, black cardamom, saffron, nutmeg, cinnamon, poppy seed, ginger, woodfordia, asparagus, withania, adhatoda, and rosemary have been reported to be used in preparing aromatized plum wine. The Santa Rosa plum cultivar produces the best quality wine, in comparison Methley, and Green Gage.

In China, candied fruits are also sold preserved, flavoured with sugar, salt, and liquorice. A study on foraging in the Gongba Valley (Zhouqu county in Gansu, China) identified Prunus salicina as one of the most commonly eaten wild fruits. Liquor made from Prunus salicina fruit is mixed with Prunus mume liquor, and oolong tea liquor to make a Japanese-style plum liquor, wumeijiu (smoked plum liquor), in Taiwan.  

In Japan, while it is less commonly eaten than closely related Prunus mume, it is pickled and colored in a similar manner. Especially in Eastern Japan, many summer festivals sell pickled fruits covered in mizuame candy called anzuame (apricot candy, as apricots were traditionally used for the recipe). 

In both countries, it is also used half ripe as a flavouring in a liqueur called sumomo shu (すもも酒) in Japanesephoto . 

For other uses of this and similar species see plum.

Medicinal
The fruits are also used in Traditional Chinese medicine, to enhance immunity against infectious agents and to treat cancers.  Japanese plums cv. Crimson Globe may be taken as a source of antioxidants with a potential to counteract oxidation. Prunus salicina fruit may contain immunostimulatory (stimulating the immune system by inducing activation or increasing activity) components that potentially may be useful in human and veterinary medicine.  Compared to other fruits, Japanese plums, include a reasonable source of fiber and proper source of bioactive compounds (such as vitamin C and phenolic composition). Their phenolic composition positively correlates to their antioxidant properties.  A study evaluating ethanol extracts from 400 herbs found that the Japanese plum was the most effective Glucosyltransferase (GTF) inhibitor and showed the highest antibacterial activity.There has been research into whether the fruit of the Japanese plum has cancer-protective effects because of its antioxidant properties, but as of 2023, it is unclear what role antioxidants in general, play in cancer protection and treatment.

 Toxicity 
As with other stone fruits, the pit and leaves are poisonous to humans, as they contain amydalin, which breaks down to hydrogen cyanide.  While poisoning from unintentional ingestion of a few pits is unlikely, it recommended to avoid ingestion, and to never consume crushed up pits. 

See alsoPrunus mume''

References

External links

 
 
 ibiblio.org - Prunus salicina
 U.Melb-AU: Sorting Prunus names

salicina
salicina
Fruits originating in East Asia
Flora of China
Japanese cuisine
Japanese fruit
Trees of China
Garden plants of Asia